Hung Huang ( is an American-Chinese television host, author, actress, blogger, media figure, and the publisher of the fashion magazine iLook.

Personal life 
Hung's mother, Zhang Hanzhi worked as a translator and English tutor for Mao Zedong. Her mother and her father, Hong Junyan (洪君彦), divorced in 1973. Zhang then married Qiao Guanhua, the Foreign Minister of the People's Republic of China in the 1970s. Hung's mother was later accused of collaborating with the Gang of Four and was placed under house arrest for two years. Hung attended Vassar College.

Hung married three times, all of them ended in divorce. Her first husband is the film director Chen Kaige. In 2006, Hung adopted a daughter from Sichuan.

Career
Hung worked in factories until 1998, when she agreed to take over the publication of Look, a magazine that is now known as I-Look.

A CNN article stated that she had been referred to as "China's answer to Oprah Winfrey and Anna Wintour." Since early 2012, she has written a weekly column called ChinaFile for Women's Wear Daily.

She has been selected by the Time magazine as one of the world's 100 most influential people in 2011.

References

External links
 "Hung Huang: China's Oprah." CNN.
 Hung Huang's Blog 
 Hung, Huang. "Dear laowai, don't mess with our Chinese-ness." China Daily. January 12, 2010. (Alternate link)
 Jeremy Goldkorn. "Hung Huang, Chen Kaige and the Steamed Bun." Danwei. February 18, 2006.
 "3月22日朋友会——洪晃." China Central Television. 
 At Home: Hung Huang (Financial Times, 27 Jan 2012)

Living people
Chinese bloggers
Chinese women bloggers
People's Republic of China essayists
Chinese autobiographers
Writers from Beijing
Vassar College alumni
Actresses from Beijing
Women autobiographers
American women bloggers
Year of birth missing (living people)
American bloggers
21st-century American women